Tanch'ŏn is a port city in northeastern South Hamgyŏng province, North Korea.  It has a population of approximately 360,000. Tanch'ŏn borders the Sea of Japan (East Sea of Korea), into which the Namdae River flows.

Administrative divisions
Tanch'ŏn is divided into 39 tong (neighbourhoods) and 39 ri (villages):

Economy
There are extensive mineral resources in the area, including cobalt, magnesite, and iron ore.
The city is known for its chemical production, textiles, metal ware, machinery and smelting. The Komdok mine is located in Kumgol-1 dong. The Taehung mine is located in South Hamgyong Province.

The area is also home to the large Tanchon Power Station (under construction as of April 2020), consisting of hundreds of kilometres of waterway tunnels and a planned six power stations, that has been under construction since 2017.

Technology
The City of Tanch'ŏn is featured in the PC game Tradewinds.

Transport
Tanch'ŏn is situated on the P'yŏngra Line and the Hŏch'ŏn Line of the Korean State Railway. In 2012 the city's port was renovated and upgraded. Tanch'ŏn port was reconstructed, and a ceremony marking the completion was taken place in December 2012. In the ceremony, a joint congratulatory message sent by the Central Committee of the Workers’ Party of Korea and the Cabinet was read to the officials and members of shock brigades who performed labor feats in the construction of the port.

A trolleybus line runs within Tanchon from next to Kumgol station in Kumgol 1-dong to Kumgol 3-dong with a length of over 6 km. The line was opened in 1986 to serve the Komdok mining region though there have been no trolleybuses seen on satellite imagery since 2011.

Wildlife
The population of Chinese gorals in Tanch'ŏn has been designated North Korean natural monument #293.

Climate
Tanchon has a humid continental climate (Köppen climate classification: Dfa).

See also

Administrative divisions of North Korea
Geography of North Korea
South Hamgyong

References

Further reading

Dormels, Rainer. North Korea's Cities: Industrial facilities, internal structures and typification. Jimoondang, 2014.

External links

City profile of Tanchon 

Cities in South Hamgyong
Port cities and towns in North Korea